Angelo "Nani" Franzosi (7 November 1921 – 8 February 2010) was an Italian professional football player and manager, who played as a goalkeeper.

External links
 Career summary by playerhistory.com 
 

1921 births
2010 deaths
Italian footballers
Italy international footballers
Serie A players
Serie B players
Inter Milan players
Genoa C.F.C. players
Calcio Lecco 1912 players
Italian football managers
U.S. Alessandria Calcio 1912 managers
Piacenza Calcio 1919 managers
A.S.D. SolbiaSommese Calcio managers
Association football goalkeepers